Following is a list of senators of Meuse, people who have represented the department of Meuse in the Senate of France.

Third Republic

Senators for Meuse under the French Third Republic were:

Henri Bompard (1876–1879)
Charles Salmon (1876–1879)
Auguste Vivenot (1879–1884)
Auguste Honnore (1879–1886)
Edmond Develle (1885–1909)
Ernest Boulanger (1886–1907)
Jean Buvignier (1894–1902)
Raymond Poincaré (1903–1913 and 1920–1934)
Charles Humbert (1908–1920)
Jules Develle (1910–1919)
Auguste Grosdidier (1913–1923)
Pol Chevalier (1920–1935)
Georges Lecourtier (1924–1940)
Louis Courot (1935–1940)
Arthur Mirouel (1935–1940)

Fourth Republic

Senators for Meuse under the French Fourth Republic were:

Maurice Rochette (1946–1948)
Martial Brousse (1948–1959)
François Schleiter (1948–1959)

Fifth Republic 
Former senators for Meuse under the French Fifth Republic were:

François Schleiter (1959–1983)
Martial Brousse (1959–1974)
Rémi Herment (1974–2001)
Michel Rufin (1983–2001)
Gérard Longuet (2001–2011)
Claude Biwer (2001–2011)
Christian Namy (2011–2017)

As of January 2018 the senators were:

Gérard Longuet from 2011
Franck Menonville from 2017

References

Sources

 
Lists of members of the Senate (France) by department